Holloware (mostly in American English) or hollowware (in British English), or hollow-ware is tableware that forms a vessel or container of some kind, as opposed to flatware such as plates. Examples include sugar bowls, creamers, coffee pots, teapots, soup tureens, hot food covers, and jugs. It may be in pottery, metals such as silver, glass or plastic. It does not include cutlery or other metal utensils. Holloware is constructed for durability. It differs from some other silverplated items, with thicker walls and more layers of silverplate.

Dining car holloware is a type of railroad collectible (railroadiana). The relative value of pieces depends on their scarcity, age and condition, and the popularity of the trains on which the items were used. Railroads marked this holloware with information such as the railroad's name or logo and the name of the manfacturer.

Holloware is the traditional gift in the UK and the modern gift in the US for the sixteenth wedding anniversary. Holloware is the traditional gift for jubilee or wedding in Russia.

References

External links
 Holloware page from railroadiana.org

Serving and dining
Pottery shapes